Langedijk (West Frisian Dutch: Langedìk) is a former municipality in the Netherlands, in the province of North Holland and the region of West-Frisia. Langedijk received city rights in 1415.

Langedijk and the former municipality of Heerhugowaard merged into the new municipality of Dijk en Waard on 1 January 2022.

Population centres 
The former municipality of Langedijk consisted of the following cities, towns, villages and/or districts:

Topography 

Map of the former municipality of Langedijk, 2015

Local government 

The former municipal council of Langedijk consisted of 21 seats, which were divided as follows:

Notable people 

 Johannes Hertenberg (1668 in Oudkarspel – 1725) the 19th Dutch Governor of Ceylon from 1723 until his death
 Theo Nieuwenhuis (1866 in Noord-Scharwoude - 1951) a Dutch watercolor painter, lithograph designer, woodcarver and ceramics and textile designer
 Berend Tobia Boeyinga (1886 in Noord-Scharwoude - 1969) a Dutch architect, noted for his Calvinist church buildings 
 Laurens Bogtman (1900 in Oudkarspel – 1969) a Dutch baritone
 Hendrik Jan Marsman (1937 in Sint Pancras – 2012), pen name, J. Bernlef, a Dutch writer, poet, novelist and translator

Sport 
 Jan Langedijk (1910 in Oudkarspel – 1981) a Dutch speed skater who competed at the 1936 and 1948 Winter Olympics
 Gerard Kamper (born 1950 in Koedijk) a retired Dutch cyclist
 Jan Blokhuijsen (born 1989 in Zuid-Scharwoude) Dutch long-track speed skater, silver medallist at the 2014 Winter Olympics

Gallery

References

External links 

Official website

Former municipalities of North Holland
Municipalities of the Netherlands disestablished in 2022